is a Japanese football player.

Playing career
Mori was born in Shizuoka on July 24, 1980. After graduating from Shimizu Higashi High School, he joined J1 League club Verdy Kawasaki (later Tokyo Verdy) in 1999. Although he played several matches as right side back, he could not play many matches. In 2001, he moved to J2 League club Vegalta Sendai. He played many matches as regular player and the club was promoted to J1 from 2002. In August 2002, he moved to Kyoto Purple Sanga. Although he could not become a regular player, he played many matches until 2004. In 2005, he moved to newly was promoted to J1 League club, Kawasaki Frontale. He became a regular player as right side back and right side midfielder for a long time. The club also won the 2nd place 2007 and 2009 J.League Cup. In 2011, he moved to his first club Tokyo Verdy for the first time in 11 years. He played many matches as regular right side back. However his opportunity to play decreased in 2014. In 2014, he moved to J2 club FC Gifu. In 2015, he moved to J3 League club SC Sagamihara. He left the club end of 2015 season.

In 2016, Mori joined Okinawa SV. The club announced in November 2018, that Mori would leave the club at the end of the year.

Club statistics

References

External links

1980 births
Living people
Association football people from Shizuoka Prefecture
Japanese footballers
J1 League players
J2 League players
J3 League players
Tokyo Verdy players
Vegalta Sendai players
Kyoto Sanga FC players
Kawasaki Frontale players
FC Gifu players
SC Sagamihara players
Okinawa SV players
Association football defenders